The Night Cry is a 1926 American silent film family drama directed by Herman C. Raymaker and starring Rin Tin Tin. It was produced and distributed by Warner Bros.

Cast
Rin Tin Tin as himself
John Harron as John Martin
June Marlowe as Mrs. John Martin
Gayne Whitman as Miguel Hernandez
Heinie Conklin as Tony
Don Alvarado as Pedro
Mary Louis Miller as The Martin baby

Box Office
According to Warner Bros records the film earned $243,000 domestically and $41,000 foreign.

Home media
This is an extant Rin Tin Tin feature available on DVD.

References

External links

lobby poster

1926 films
American silent feature films
Warner Bros. films
Films based on short fiction
1926 drama films
American black-and-white films
Silent American drama films
Rin Tin Tin
Films directed by Herman C. Raymaker
1920s American films